John Massey Rhind (9 July 1860 – 1 January 1936) was a Scottish-American sculptor.  Among Rhind's better known works is the marble statue of Dr. Crawford W. Long located in the National Statuary Hall Collection in Washington D.C. (1926).

Early years
Born in Edinburgh, Rhind began his art studies under the tutorage of his father John Rhind, a respected and successful sculptor in the royal burgh.  He studied at the Royal Scottish Academy, and continued his education with Jules Dalou, who was at that time living and teaching in Lambeth, England.  He then moved to Paris to continue his education for two more years.  Upon completing his training he considered moving to the United States but was cautioned by his father not to do so because, "There is no sculptural art in America... You'll starve."

In 1885 he established a studio with his elder brother William Birnie Rhind, at 217 West George Street, Glasgow, but his brother moved back to Edinburgh 2 years later. At age 29, J. Massey Rhind finally emigrated to the United States in 1889 and settled in New York City. In 1899, Rhind set up a studio and sculpture yard and began residing in Closter, New Jersey.

Career
In February 1890 John Jacob Astor III died and shortly thereafter a competition to create three sets of bronze doors dedicated to him for Trinity Church, New York was announced.  Rhind entered the competition, and, along with Charles Niehaus and Karl Bitter, was awarded one of the sets of doors.  After this success he never lacked for work and was to generate a large number of public monuments and architectural projects. Nevertheless, Rhind still found time for smaller, private pieces such as a bust of Theodore Roosevelt.

Gettysburg Battlefield
Alexander S. Webb, 1915
Abner Doubleday, 1917
John Cleveland Robinson, 1917
Francis C. Barlow, 1922

Public monuments

Washington, D.C.

Nova Scotia

New York and New Jersey

Other 

 GIRARD, Stephen: Statue at the Museum of Art in Philadelphia, Pennsylvania
 WANAMAKER, John: Statue at the City Hall (east plaza) in Philadelphia, Pennsylvania
Lanape Warrior, Wissahickon Creek, Philadelphia, Pennsylvinia 1902
 Civil War Soldiers & Sailors Monument on Franklin Parkway in Philadelphia, Pennsylvania
John C. Calhoun Monument, Charleston, South Carolina, 1896
George Clinton Monument, Kingston, New York, 1898 (originally in New York City)
Henry Hudson Monument, Kingston, New York, 1898 (originally in New York City )
James Wolfe Monument, Calgary, Alberta, 1898 (originally in New York City )
Peter Stuyvesant Monument
Kingston, New York, 1898 (originally in New York City )
Peter Stuyvesant Monument, Bergen Square, Jersey City, New Jersey, 1913
Robert Burns Monument, Barre, Vermont, 1899,
Pittsburgh, Pennsylvania, 1914
Syracuse, New York, 1914
Newark, New Jersey, 1914
William T. Sherman Monument, Muskegon, Michigan, 1900
Ulysses S. Grant Memorial, Muskegon, Michigan, 1900
Statues of Samuel Colt, Colt Park, Hartford, Connecticut, 1902–06
Alexander Skene, Grand Army Plaza, Brooklyn, NY 1905
Grand Army of the Republic Memorial, Washington, D.C., 1909
George Washington, Newark, New Jersey, 1914
Bartolomeo Colleoni, reproduction of Andrea del Verrocchio's equestrian sculpture, Newark, New Jersey, 1914
National McKinley Birthplace Memorial, Niles, Ohio, 1917
Nova Scotia Highland soldier, Cenotaph, Chester, Nova Scotia, 1922
Philip Schuyler, Albany, New York, 1925
Britannia, Cenotaph, Grand Parade, Nova Scotia, 1929
Nova Scotia Highland soldier, Cenotaph, New Glasgow, Nova Scotia, 1929
Edward Cornwallis, Nova Scotia, 1931

Fountains

"Rufus H. King Memorial Fountain", Washington Park, Albany, New York, 1893: the theme, specified by King's son, J. Howard King: Moses strikes the rock at Horeb
 Corning Fountain, Bushnell Park, Hartford, Connecticut, 1899 bronze and granite, the fountain is 30 feet tall, with a statue of a deer in the middle surrounded by figures of Saukiog Indians, Hartford's first inhabitants.
"Fountain of Apollo", Lakewood, New Jersey, 1902
Erskine Memorial Fountain, Atlanta, Georgia, 1896

Architectural sculpture

New Haven County Court House 
New Haven County Court House, New Haven, Connecticut, 1914 (Architects: William Allen and Richard Williams), facing the New Haven Green.

Shelby County Court House
 Shelby County Court House, Memphis, Tennessee, 1906–1909 (architects, James Gamble Rogers and H. D. Hale)

Detroit

Other 

Alexander Memorial Hall, Princeton University, Princeton, New Jersey, 1892
The Cable Building, 611 Broadway at Houston Street, New York City, 1894
American Surety Building (now Bank of Tokyo), 100 Broadway, figures at 3rd floor level, New York, 1895 (Architect: Bruce Price)
Astor Memorial Doors, Trinity Church, New York, 1896
East Pyne, Princeton University, Princeton, New Jersey, 1896
"Victory" and "Peace", Grant's Tomb, New York City, 1897
Macy's caryatids, Macy's Department Store Building, New York City, 1901
"Victory" and "Progress", quadrigas (but with three horses instead of four), Wayne County Building, Detroit, Michigan, 1904
United States Courthouse and Post Office, Indianapolis, Indiana, 1904
Shelby County Court House, Memphis, Tennessee, 1906–1909
Federal Building, Providence, Rhode Island, 1908
"Apollo" and "Minerva" Butler Institute of American Art, Youngstown, Ohio

References
Notes

Bibliography
Cantor, Laurel M., Spires of Princeton University: An architectural tour of the campus, Office of Communications/Publications, Stanhope Hall, Princeton University
Caffin, Charles H., American Masters of Sculpture, Doubleday, Page & Company, New York  1913
Craven, Wayne, The Sculpture at Gettysburg, Eastern Acorn Press, Eastern National Park and Monument Association, 1982
Hawthorne, Frederick W., Gettysburg: Stories of Men and Monuments, The Association of Licensed Battlefield Guides,  1988
Kvaran and Lockley,  Guide to the Architectural Sculpture in America, unpublished manuscript
Mackay, James, The Dictionary of Sculptors in Bronze, Antique Collectors Club,  Woodbridge, Suffolk  1977
McSpadden, J. Walker, Famous Sculptors of America, Dodd, Mead and Company,  Inc. New York   1924
Murdock, Myrtle Cheney, National Statuary Hall in the Nation's Capitol, Monumental Press, Inc., Washington D.C., 1955
Nawrocki, Dennis Alan and Thomas J. Holleman, Art in Detroit Public Places, Wayne State University Press, Detroit, Michigan,  1980
Opitz, Glenn B, Editor, Mantle Fielding's Dictionary of American Painters, Sculptors & Engravers,  Apollo Book, Poughkeepsie NY, 1986
Thurkow, Fearn, Newark's Sculpture: A Survey of Public Monuments and Memorial Statuary,  The Newark Museum Quarterly, Newark Museum Association, Winter 1975
Whittmore, Frances Davis, George Washington in Sculpture, Marshall Jones Company, Boston,  1933

External links
 gettysburg sculptures  Massey Rhind
 

1860 births
1936 deaths
American architectural sculptors
19th-century American sculptors
19th-century American male artists
American male sculptors
Scottish emigrants to the United States
Artists from Edinburgh
Scottish sculptors
Scottish male sculptors
19th-century British sculptors
20th-century American sculptors
People from Closter, New Jersey
National Sculpture Society members
20th-century American male artists